Svetlana Podobedova (born May 25, 1986, Zima, Irkutsk) is a Russian-born Kazakhstani weightlifter.

Career
Podobedova was awarded the gold medal at the 2012 Summer Olympics in the women's 75 kg category with a total of 291 kg.  Her 161 kg Clean and jerk was an Olympic record and her 291 kg total tied the Olympic record set only minutes before by Natalia Zabolotnaya.  She was awarded the medal by virtue of lighter bodyweight.

In June 2016, following the Russian doping scandal, it was announced by the IWF that retests of the samples taken from the 2012 Olympics indicated that Podobedova had tested positive for prohibited substances, namely Stanazolol. If confirmed, she faced losing her Olympic medal, and all results and medals earned from the date of the sample in 2012 to 2016. In October 2016, she was stripped of her Olympic medal. Zabolotnaya and the bronze medalist, Iryna Kulesha, were disqualified and stripped of their medals as well.

References

External links
 
 the-sports.org
 
 
 
 

1986 births
Living people
Russian female weightlifters
Kazakhstani female weightlifters
World record setters in weightlifting
Weightlifters at the 2012 Summer Olympics
Olympic weightlifters of Kazakhstan
World Weightlifting Championships medalists
Asian Games gold medalists for Kazakhstan
Asian Games medalists in weightlifting
Weightlifters at the 2010 Asian Games
Doping cases in weightlifting
Kazakhstani sportspeople in doping cases
Competitors stripped of Summer Olympics medals
Kazakhstani people of Russian descent
Russian expatriate sportspeople in Kazakhstan
People from Irkutsk Oblast
Russian emigrants to Kazakhstan
Medalists at the 2010 Asian Games
European Weightlifting Championships medalists
Sportspeople from Irkutsk Oblast